Lama is a Japanese supergroup consisting of former Supercar members Kōji Nakamura and Miki Furukawa, along with Hisako Tabuchi and Kensuke Ushio.

Biography
The band was formed in 2011 and is made up of Koji Nakamura (Supercar, iLL, Nyantora), Miki Furukawa (Supercar), Hisako Tabuchi (Number Girl, Bloodthirsty Butchers, Toddle), and Kensuke Ushio (agraph). They made their live debut at a show with Kimonos in April 2011. Their debut single "Spell" and released in August 2011, was used as the opening for the Fuji Television noitaminA anime television series, No. 6. They were also used for the closing theme of Fuji Television's noitaminA anime television series Un-Go with their third single "Fantasy/Cupid【期間生産限定盤】", released in October 2011. , The "Parallel Sign" was used as the insert song for the anime series,  Eureka Seven: AO. The band is signed with the Sony label Ki/oon Records, which Nakamura, Furukawa, and Ushio are also affiliated with as solo artists.

 Members 
 Miki Furukawa (フルカワミキ) - vocals, bass
 Kōji Nakamura (中村弘二) a.k.a. Nakako (ナカコー) - vocals, guitar
 Hisako Tabuchi (田渕ひさ子) - guitar, chorus
 Kensuke Ushio (牛尾憲輔), a.k.a. agraph - programming

 Discography 

 Studio albums 
 New! (2011)
 Modanica (2012)

 Singles 
2011
 Spell Cupid Fantasy2012
 Parallel Sign Seven Swell''

References

External links
Official website 
Lama at Twitter

Japanese pop music groups
Japanese pop rock music groups
Ki/oon Music artists
Japanese rock music groups
Japanese electronic music groups
Musical groups established in 2011
2011 establishments in Japan
Rock music supergroups